"Aqualung" is a song by the British progressive rock band Jethro Tull, and the title track from their Aqualung (1971) album. The song was written by the band's frontman, Ian Anderson, and his then-wife Jennie Franks.

While this track was never a single, its self titled album Aqualung was Jethro Tull's first American Top 10 album, reaching number seven in June 1971. After "Locomotive Breath", it is the song most often played in concert by Jethro Tull.

Recording
The original recording runs for 6:34. In an interview with singer Ian Anderson in the September 1999 Guitar World, he said:

The Aqualung character is also mentioned in "Cross-Eyed Mary", the next song on the album.

In a 2015 interview, Martin Barre recounted an interesting situation with Led Zeppelin while recording the song's solo.

An alternative mix of "Aqualung", with a very different echo effect on Anderson's vocal, appears on the compilation M.U. – The Best of Jethro Tull (1976). This version also has different acoustic guitar and vocal parts during the first part of the song ("sun streaking cold"), but then reverts to the regular mix at ("Aqualung my friend..."). This is most likely due to the fact that all the tracks from Aqualung on M.U. – The Best of Jethro Tull were taken from the original quad-mix of the LP.

The track was not released as a single. As Ian Anderson explained during an interview with Songfacts:

Recorded appearances
 Aqualung (1971)
 M.U. – The Best of Jethro Tull (1976)
 Bursting Out (1978)
 Slipstream (1981)
 A Classic Case (1985)
 Original Masters (1985)
 20 Years of Jethro Tull (1988)
 20 Years of Jethro Tull: Highlights (1988)
 The Very Best of Jethro Tull (2001)
 Living with the Past (2002)
 A New Day Yesterday (2003)
 Ian Anderson Plays the Orchestral Jethro Tull (2005)
 Aqualung Live (2005)

Personnel
Jethro Tull
 Ian Anderson – vocals, acoustic guitar, producer
 Martin Barre – electric guitar
 John Evan – piano, organ
 Jeffrey Hammond – bass guitar
 Clive Bunker – drums, percussion

Additional Personnel
 Terry Ellis - producer

In popular culture

 The song is referenced in the 2004 film Anchorman: The Legend of Ron Burgundy: Burgundy (Will Ferrell) plays a jazz flute solo incorporating the beginning of the song.
 The opening lyric and riff of "Aqualung" are muttered by Tony Soprano as he comes into the kitchen in episode #71 ("Live Free or Die") of the TV series The Sopranos.
 The rendered character of Icarus in the video game God of War II was inspired by Aqualung found on the cover of the album.
The song is featured as a playable song in the music video games Rock Band 2 (2008) and Guitar Hero: Warriors Of Rock (2010).

References

External links
 
 Aqualung Lyrics
 Songfacts "Aqualung" entry

Jethro Tull (band) songs
1971 songs
Songs written by Ian Anderson
Songs about homelessness
Song recordings produced by Ian Anderson
Rock ballads
1970s ballads